

This is a list of the National Register of Historic Places listings in Carroll County, Ohio.

It is intended to be a complete list of the properties on the National Register of Historic Places in Carroll County, Ohio, United States.  The locations of National Register properties for which the latitude and longitude coordinates are included below, may be seen in a Google map.

There are 11 properties listed on the National Register in the county.  Another property was once listed but has been removed.

Current listings

|}

Former listing

|}

See also

 List of National Historic Landmarks in Ohio
 Listings in neighboring counties: Columbiana, Harrison, Jefferson, Stark, Tuscarawas
 National Register of Historic Places listings in Ohio

References

 
Carroll